A Gentle Breeze in the Village, also known as , is a Japanese slice of life manga series written and illustrated by Fusako Kuramochi. It was serialized in the magazine Chorus from 1994 to 2000.

The manga won the 20th Kodansha Manga Award in 1996.

It was made into a movie in 2007, directed by Nobuhiro Yamashita and starring Kaho. It was released on July 24, 2007.

Plot summary
One of six students in a combined primary and junior high school, Soyo Migita (Kaho) is the most senior pupil. For her, school is a joyful experience with an extended family of loving little brothers and sisters, but her days as the tallest and oldest student are soon to be over.

Hiromi Osawa (Masaki Okada), a cool boy from Tokyo, arrives in the village. Attracted to him, Soyo tries to ignore the feelings that begin to occupy her heart and mind. However, she soon surrenders to her passion and learns to act upon her newfound emotions.

Main characters

A boy who came from Tokyo and became Soyo's first classmate. He later becomes her boyfriend. He has a very good sense of fashion.

One grade younger than Soyo and her best friend. She wants to be a manga illustrator. She uses Hiromi as a model for the male character in her story.

One grade younger than Soyo and her best friend. His house is a store.

Mother of Soyo.

Film
The film was shown at the 2007 Toronto International Film Festival during the Contemporary World Cinema programme. It was later shown at the 28th Yokohama Film Festival.

Tennen Kokekkō was ranked as the 2007 Asahi Best Ten Film Festival Number 1, 2007 Japan Movie Best Ten Number 2, and as the 2007 Yokohama Film Festival Japan Movie Best Ten Number 2. Kaho has won two new actress awards from this film, including the Best New Actress award.

Cast
Kaho as Soyo Migita
Masaki Okada as Hiromi Osawa
Erisa Yanagi as Ibuki Taura
Shoko Fujimura as Atsuko Yamabe
Yui Natsukawa as Itoko Migita
Kōichi Satō as Atsuko's Father

Staff
Director: Nobuhiro Yamashita
Filming: Tatsuto Kondō
Music: Rei Harakami
Theme song: "Kotoba wa Sankaku Kokoro wa Shikaku" by Kururi

Filming location
Shimane Prefecture

References

External links

Official Live-action film Site 

1994 manga
2007 films
Live-action films based on manga
Films directed by Nobuhiro Yamashita
Films set in Shimane Prefecture
2000s Japanese films
2000s Japanese-language films
Winner of Kodansha Manga Award (Shōjo)
Manga adapted into films
Romance anime and manga
Shōjo manga
Shueisha franchises
Shueisha manga
Slice of life anime and manga